Ernst Gustav Kirsch (September 13, 1841 – January 8, 1901) was a German engineer. He was educated at Sorbonne, in Zürich and in Berlin. He was a professor from 1874 at the Chemnitz University of Technology in Chemnitz, Germany. Kirsch is primarily known for the Kirsch equations describing the elastic stress state around a hole.

External links
User-tu-chemnitz.de
Sign.: 502 - 000253.jpg
Sign.: 502 - 000324.jpg
CE.berkeley.edu

1841 births
1901 deaths
Engineers from Chemnitz
University of Paris alumni
Academic staff of the Chemnitz University of Technology